Exilisia marmorea is a moth of the subfamily Arctiinae. It was described by Arthur Gardiner Butler in 1882. It is found on Madagascar.

References

 Arctiidae genus list at Butterflies and Moths of the World of the Natural History Museum

Lithosiini
Moths described in 1882